Live at 5th Street Dick's is the first album by American jazz saxophonist Kamasi Washington and his backing band The Next Step. It was self-released in 2005 as a double CD of live music. The album contains early versions of the tracks "Changing of the Guards", "Askim" and "The Next Step", included later on Washington's first mainstream album, The Epic.

Track listing
All tracks written by Kamasi Washington, except for track 3 ("After the Rain") which is a cover of John Coltrane.
Based on:
First CD
Changing of the Guard – 18:38
The Next Step – 23:32
After the Rain – 13:01
The Magnificent Seven – 17:07
Second CD
Journey – 17:50
Stages – 15:15
Askim – 15:02

Personnel
Based on:
Tenor saxophone – Kamasi Washington
Acoustic bass – Miles Mosley
Alto saxophone – Terrace Martin (tracks: 1–1, 1–2)
Drums – Robert Miller
Electric bass – Stephen Bruner
Keyboards – Brandon Coleman
Piano – Cameron Graves
Soprano saxophone – Rickey Washington (track: 2–3)
Trombone – Ryan Porter

References

External links
 

2005 debut albums
2005 live albums
Kamasi Washington albums